Stephanie Schiller (born 25 July 1986 in Potsdam, East Germany) is an Olympic-medalist sculler, winning a bronze medal in the women's quadruple sculls at the 2008 Summer Olympics (with Britta Oppelt, Manuela Lutze and Kathrin Boron).  She also won a World Championship gold medal in the same event with Julia Richter, Tina Manker and Britta Oppelt.

Notes

References

External links
 
 
 
 

1986 births
Living people
German female rowers
Olympic rowers of Germany
Rowers at the 2008 Summer Olympics
Rowers at the 2012 Summer Olympics
Olympic bronze medalists for Germany
Olympic medalists in rowing
Medalists at the 2008 Summer Olympics
Sportspeople from Potsdam
World Rowing Championships medalists for Germany